Christmas Celebration is a compilation album by Mannheim Steamroller. It is the group's seventh Christmas album overall. The album was released in 2004 on CD and DVD-Audio by American Gramaphone to celebrate the 20th anniversary of the group's first Christmas album.

The album features eighteen Christmas songs in progressive rock and Renaissance styles, and includes a new track, "Celebration." A vocal version of "Traditions of Christmas," previously released only on a sampler CD included with the book Christmas: A Night Like No Other, is also included. The remaining songs are new mixes of previously released songs.

An edition of the album available exclusively at Target stores featured two extra songs: "The Holly and the Ivy" and "Messengers of Christmas."

Featured keyboard artist and Steamroller co-founder Jackson Berkey makes his final appearance on a Mannheim Steamroller Christmas album.

Track listing
Writing credits adapted from liner notes except as indicated.

See also
 List of Billboard Top Holiday Albums number ones of the 2000s

References

2004 Christmas albums
Christmas albums by American artists
Christmas compilation albums
2004 compilation albums
Mannheim Steamroller albums
American Gramaphone compilation albums
Classical Christmas albums
New-age Christmas albums